Karen Alexa Grasso Montes (born August 9, 1993) is a Mexican mixed martial artist who competes in the flyweight division of the Ultimate Fighting Championship (UFC), where she is the current UFC Women's Flyweight Champion. She is also a UFC analyst for UFC Español for Spanish broadcasts. As of March 7, 2023, she is ranked #2 in the UFC women's pound-for-pound rankings.

Mixed martial arts career

Early career
Grasso made her professional MMA debut in December 2012 in her native Mexico.  During the first eighteen months of her career, she amassed an undefeated record of 5 wins (3 by TKO, 2 by decision) and 0 losses.

Invicta FC
After taking a year away from the sport, Grasso made her Invicta FC debut on September 6, 2014 against Ashley Cummins at Invicta FC 8.  She won the fight via unanimous decision.

In her second fight for the promotion, Grasso faced Alida Gray on December 5, 2014 at Invicta FC 10.  She won the fight via TKO in the first round.

Grasso next faced Mizuki Inoue on February 27, 2015 in the co-main event at Invicta FC 11. She won the fight by unanimous decision.  The bout also earned Grasso her first Fight of the Night bonus award.

Grasso was expected to challenge Livia Renata Souza for the Invicta Strawweight Title at Invicta FC 14 on 12 September 2015 but was forced to withdraw due to injury.

Ultimate Fighting Championship 
On August 11, 2016, it was announced that Grasso had signed with the Ultimate Fighting Championship (UFC). She faced Heather Jo Clark on November 5, 2016 at The Ultimate Fighter Latin America 3 Finale: dos Anjos vs. Ferguson in Mexico City, Mexico. She won the fight by unanimous decision.

Grasso next faced Felice Herrig on February 4, 2017 at UFC Fight Night 104. She lost the fight by unanimous decision, marking the first defeat in her professional career.

On August 5, 2017, Grasso faced Randa Markos at UFC Fight Night: Pettis vs. Moreno. Grasso suffered from a urinary tract infection and was medically advised to stop cutting weight and be placed on antibiotics, as a result she came in at 119 lbs, three pounds over the strawweight limit and was fined 20% of her purse that went to Markos. The bout proceeded at a catchweight. Grasso won the fight via split decision.

Grasso faced Tatiana Suarez on May 19, 2018 at UFC Fight Night 129. She lost the fight via a rear-naked choke in round one.

Grasso was scheduled to face Angela Hill on August 25, 2018 at UFC Fight Night 135. However, Grasso was pulled out from the bout on July 19, 2018 due to knee injury.

Grasso was expected to face Marina Rodriguez on February 2, 2019 at UFC Fight Night 144. However, it was reported on December 17, 2018 that Rodriguez pulled out of the event due to a hand injury. The pair was rescheduled to UFC on ESPN 2. However, on March 22, 2019 it was reported Grasso was injured and she was replaced by Jessica Aguilar.

Grasso faced Karolina Kowalkiewicz on June 8, 2019 at UFC 238. She won the fight by unanimous decision.

Grasso faced Carla Esparza on September 21, 2019 at UFC on ESPN+ 17. She lost the fight by majority decision.  This fight earned her the Fight of the Night award.

Grasso was scheduled to face Cláudia Gadelha on January 18, 2020 at UFC 246. However, on the day of the weigh-ins, Grasso weighed in at 121.5, 5.5 pounds over the non-title strawweight limit of 116 lbs. The NSAC decided to remove the fight because competitors are not allowed to compete if the weight between them is over 3 pounds. In a statement released just hours after the weigh-ins, Grasso apologized for missing weight, and declared she will now be fighting at flyweight.

Move up to flyweight
Grasso was scheduled to face Ji Yeon Kim on June 27, 2020 at UFC on ESPN: Poirier vs. Hooker. However, due to travel restrictions for both fighters due to COVID-19 pandemic, the bout was rescheduled on August 29, 2020 at UFC Fight Night 175.  She won the fight via unanimous decision.

Grasso faced Maycee Barber on February 13, 2021 at UFC 258. She won the fight via unanimous decision.

Grasso was scheduled to face Joanne Wood on November 20, 2021 at UFC Fight Night 198. However, Grasso was forced to pull out from the event due to injury and she was replaced by Taila Santos.

Grasso was expected to face Viviane Araújo on January 22, 2022 at UFC 270. However, Araújo was forced to pull out from the event due to injury, and the bout was cancelled.

Grasso faced Joanne Wood in a re-scheduled bout on March 26, 2022 at UFC on ESPN 33. She won the fight via a rear-naked choke in the first round.

Grasso was rescheduled to face Viviane Araújo on August 13, 2022 at UFC on ESPN 41. However, the bout was cancelled due to Grasso's visa issues. The pair was yet again rescheduled on October 15, 2022 at UFC Fight Night 212. Grasso won the fight via unanimous decision.

UFC Women's Flyweight Champion
Grasso faced Valentina Shevchenko on March 4, 2023 for the UFC Women's Flyweight Championship at UFC 285. She won the bout and earned the title via a face crank in the fourth round. This made her the first Mexican UFC women’s champion. The win earned Grasso her first Performance of the Night bonus award.

Championships and accomplishments

Mixed martial arts
Ultimate Fighting Championship
UFC Women's Flyweight Championship (one time, current)
Fight of the Night (one time) 
Performance of the Night (one time) 
Third most significant strikes thrown in a 3-round fight (369) vs. Karolina Kowalkiewicz
First Mexican woman to win a UFC Championship
MMAJunkie.com
2015 February Fight of the Month vs. Mizuki Inoue
Invicta Fighting Championships
Fight of the Night (one time) 
Performance of the Night (one time) vs. Jodie Esquibel

Mixed martial arts record

|-
|Win
|align=center|16–3
|Valentina Shevchenko
|Submission (face crank)
|UFC 285
|
|align=center|4
|align=center|4:34
|Las Vegas, Nevada, United States
|
|-
|Win
|align=center|15–3
|Viviane Araújo
|Decision (unanimous)
|UFC Fight Night: Grasso vs. Araújo
|
|align=center|5
|align=center|5:00
|Las Vegas, Nevada, United States
|
|-
|Win
|align=center|14–3
|Joanne Wood
|Submission (rear-naked choke)
|UFC on ESPN: Blaydes vs. Daukaus
|
|align=center|1
|align=center|3:57
|Columbus, Ohio, United States
|
|-
|Win
|align=center|13–3
|Maycee Barber
|Decision (unanimous)
|UFC 258
|
|align=center|3
|align=center|5:00
|Las Vegas, Nevada, United States
|
|-
|Win
|align=center|12–3
|Ji Yeon Kim
|Decision (unanimous)
|UFC Fight Night: Smith vs. Rakić
|
|align=center|3
|align=center|5:00
|Las Vegas, Nevada, United States
|
|-
|Loss
|align=center|11–3
|Carla Esparza
|Decision (majority)
|UFC Fight Night: Rodríguez vs. Stephens
|
|align=center|3
|align=center|5:00
|Mexico City, Mexico
|
|-
|Win
|align=center|11–2
|Karolina Kowalkiewicz
|Decision (unanimous)
|UFC 238
|
|align=center|3
|align=center|5:00
|Chicago, Illinois, United States
|
|- 
|Loss
|align=center|10–2
|Tatiana Suarez
|Submission (rear-naked choke)
|UFC Fight Night: Maia vs. Usman
|
|align=center|1
|align=center|2:44
|Santiago, Chile
|
|-
|Win
|align=center|10–1
|Randa Markos
|Decision (split)
|UFC Fight Night: Pettis vs. Moreno
|
|align=center|3
|align=center|5:00
|Mexico City, Mexico
|
|-
|Loss
|align=center|9–1
|Felice Herrig
|Decision (unanimous)
|UFC Fight Night: Bermudez vs. The Korean Zombie
|
|align=center|3
|align=center|5:00
|Houston, Texas, United States
|
|-
|Win
|align=center|9–0
|Heather Jo Clark
|Decision (unanimous)
|The Ultimate Fighter Latin America 3 Finale: dos Anjos vs. Ferguson
|
|align=center|3
|align=center|5:00
|Mexico City, Mexico
|
|-
|Win
|align=center|8–0
|Jodie Esquibel
|Decision (unanimous)
|Invicta FC 18: Grasso vs. Esquibel
|
|align=center|3
|align=center|5:00
|Kansas City, Missouri, United States
|
|-
|Win
|align=center|7–0
|Mizuki Inoue
|Decision (unanimous)
|Invicta FC 11: Cyborg vs. Tweet
|
|align=center|3
|align=center|5:00
|Los Angeles, California, United States
|
|-
|Win
|align=center|6–0
|Alida Gray
|TKO (punches)
|Invicta FC 10: Waterson vs. Tiburcio
|
|align=center|1
|align=center|1:47
|Houston, Texas, United States
|
|-
|Win
|align=center|5–0
|Ashley Cummins
|Decision (unanimous)
|Invicta FC 8: Waterson vs. Tamada
|
|align=center|3
|align=center|5:00
|Kansas City, Missouri, United States
|
|-
|Win
|align=center|4–0
|Karina Rodríguez
|Decision (unanimous)
|Xtreme Kombat 20
|
|align=center|3
|align=center|5:00
|Izcalli, Mexico
|
|-
|Win
|align=center|3–0
|Alejandra Alvarez
|TKO (punches and knees)
|Xtreme Kombat 20
|
|align=center|1
|align=center|0:36
|Izcalli, Mexico
|
|-
|Win
|align=center|2–0
|Lupita Hernandez
|KO (punch)
|Fight Hard Championship 3
|
|align=center|1
|align=center|0:12
|Jalisco, Mexico
|
|-
|Win
|align=center|1–0
|Sandra del Rincon
|KO (punch)
|GEX: Old Jack's Fight Night
|
|align=center|1
|align=center|0:15
|Jalisco, Mexico
|
|-

See also
 List of female mixed martial artists
 List of current UFC fighters

References

External links

 

1993 births
Living people
Strawweight mixed martial artists
Mexican female mixed martial artists
Sportspeople from Guadalajara, Jalisco
Mexican practitioners of Brazilian jiu-jitsu
Female Brazilian jiu-jitsu practitioners
Ultimate Fighting Championship female fighters
Ultimate Fighting Championship champions
Flyweight mixed martial artists
Mixed martial artists utilizing boxing
Mixed martial artists utilizing Brazilian jiu-jitsu